Marcelo Charpentier (born 11 July 1973) is a former professional tennis player from Argentina.

Career
Charpentier was the 18s and under Orange Bowl champion in 1991.

He had his best performance on tour at the 1996 Campionati Internazionali di San Marino, getting past seeded players Hernán Gumy and Gilbert Schaller en route to the semi-finals, where he lost to Albert Costa.

In 1997 he took part in a Davis Cup tie for Argentina. He lost his only rubber, a singles match against Nicolás Lapentti from Ecuador. Also that year he appeared in two Grand Slams. He exited in the first round of the 1997 French Open, to Francisco Clavet, but did stretch the Spaniard to five sets. At Wimbledon he was beaten in the opening round by eventual runner-up Cédric Pioline.

The only other Grand Slam he took part in was the 2000 French Open and he managed to defeat world number 30 Karim Alami, in another five set match. He was unable to progress past the second round, losing to Gustavo Kuerten, who he had partnered four years earlier to win a Challenger title in Slovakia.

Challenger titles

Singles: (2)

Doubles: (5)

References

1973 births
Living people
Argentine male tennis players
Tennis players from Buenos Aires